The 1978 Wightman Cup was the 50th edition of the annual women's team tennis competition between the United States and Great Britain. It was held at the Royal Albert Hall in London in England in the United Kingdom. This was the final time the Great Britain team won the competition prior to its discontinuation following the 1989 edition.

References

Wightman Cups by year
Wightman Cup, 1978
Wightman Cup, 1978
Wightman Cup, 1978
Wightman Cup, 1978
Wightman Cup, 1978
Wightman Cup